Electoral district of Brisbane may refer to:

 Division of Brisbane (created 1901), electorate of the Australian House of Representatives
 Electoral district of Brisbane (New South Wales) (1859), former electorate of the New South Wales Legislative Assembly
 Electoral district of Town of Brisbane (1860–1873), former electorate of the Queensland Legislative Assembly
 Electoral district of Brisbane City (1873–1878), former electorate of the Queensland Legislative Assembly
 Electoral district of Brisbane (Queensland) (1912–1977), former electorate of the Queensland Legislative Assembly
 Electoral district of Brisbane Central (1977–2017), former electorate of the Queensland Legislative Assembly

See also
 Electoral district of North Brisbane (1878–1888), former electorate of the Queensland Legislative Assembly
 Electoral district of Brisbane North (1888–1912), former electorate of the Queensland Legislative Assembly
 Electoral district of Town of South Brisbane (1860–1873), former electorate of the Queensland Legislative Assembly
 Electoral district of South Brisbane (created 1873), electorate of the Queensland Legislative Assembly